A constitutional referendum was held in French Dahomey and French Togoland on 5 May 1946 as part of the wider French constitutional referendum. The new proposed new constitution was rejected by 55.4% of voters, with a turnout of 56.7%.

Results

References

1946 referendums
May 1946 events in Africa
1946
1946 in French Dahomey
1946
1946 in French Togoland
1946
Constitutional referendums in France